Cindy Denby (born December 11, 1955) is a Republican politician from Michigan currently serving in the Michigan House of Representatives. She also served for 16 years on the Handy Township Board of Trustees: eight years as township clerk and eight as supervisor.

Denby is a member of numerous community boards and organizations, and is the former owner of a bookkeeping service.

See also 
 2008 Michigan House of Representatives election

References

External links 
 Cindy Denny at ballotpedia.org

1955 births
People from Howell, Michigan
Living people
Republican Party members of the Michigan House of Representatives
Women state legislators in Michigan
21st-century American politicians
21st-century American women politicians